Ryūkō Gō (born 26 May 1968 as Luis Gō Ikemori) is a  former sumo wrestler from São Paulo, Brazil.

Career
As a youth he did judo, turning to sumo at age 16. At age 18 he went to Japan and won an international tournament, and in 1990 competing for Takushoku University he became the first Brazilian to win the Japanese National Collegiate Sumo Championship. He turned professional in May 1992, joining the Tamanoi stable. He was the first foreign wrestler ever to be granted makushita tsukedashi status, meaning that because of his amateur sumo achievements he could start at the bottom of the third highest makushita division. He reached elite sekitori status in March 1994 when he was promoted to the jūryō division. Ryūkō was his final shikona or fighting name – he was also known as Ikemori and Ryūdō. His highest rank was Jūryō 8, achieved in March 1995. He had Japanese parentage and adopted Japanese citizenship on 22 April 1996 (the same day as Akebono). Having fallen down the banzuke rankings he retired in January 1999. He has remained in Japan, working for a Tokyo business.

Career record

See also
List of non-Japanese sumo wrestlers
List of past sumo wrestlers

References

1971 births
Living people
Brazilian people of Japanese descent
Brazilian sumo wrestlers
Sportspeople from São Paulo